G25 may refer to:
 G25 Changchun–Shenzhen Expressway in China
 G25 Sniper Rifle, used by the German Armed Forces
 Gribovsky G-25, a Soviet aircraft
 Glock 25, a pistol
 , a N-class destroyer of the Royal Australian Navy
 Logitech G25, an electronic steering wheel designed for Sim racing video games
 Zenoah G-25, an aircraft engine